The following lists events that happened during 1821 in New Zealand.

Events
12 July – Thomas Kendall, Hongi Hika and Waikato arrive back in the Bay of Islands from their trip to England. While in England they have helped to compile a Maori dictionary, met King George IV who gave Hongi a suit of armour, and Hongi has acquired a number of muskets (his primary purpose).
20 July – Grass is sown for the first time in New Zealand, on land cleared from fern at Kerikeri.
5 September  – Hongi Hika and 2000 Ngā Puhi, armed with 1000 muskets, lay siege to Mauinaina pā at Tamaki. The pā is taken and the inhabitants massacred.
September
 – John Gare Butler and his family move into the Mission House even though it is still unfinished.

Undated
Construction of the Mission House is started.
Late in the year Hongi Hika and Ngā Puhi lay siege to the Ngāti Maru pā at Te Totara (Thames), but after 2 days they make peace with the defenders and withdraw. They return that night and take the pā without difficulty.
Te Rauparaha and Ngāti Toa move south from Kawhia to resettle in Taranaki after several defeats by Waikato and Ngāti Maniapoto.

Births
 21 February (in Scotland): James Menzies, Superintendent of Southland Province.
 12 July (in England): William Richmond, politician.
 10 August (in England): John Turnbull Thomson, engineer and surveyor.
 29 August (in Kerikeri): Elizabeth Fairburn (later Elizabeth Colenso), missionary and Bible translator.
 10 September (in England): William Jervois, 10th Governor of New Zealand
 2 November (in Ireland): George Bowen, 5th Governor of New Zealand.

Undated
 John Bacot, politician.
 (in England): Samuel Bealey, runholder and politician.
 (in England): Thomas Brunner, explorer.
 (in Scotland): John Cargill, politician.
 Oswald Curtis, politician.
 George Hunter, politician.
 (in England): Charles Kettle, surveyor of Dunedin.
 Reader Wood, politician.
Approximate
 (in England): William Montgomery, politician and merchant.
 (in Ireland): George O'Brien, painter.

Deaths

See also
List of years in New Zealand
Timeline of New Zealand history
History of New Zealand
Military history of New Zealand
Timeline of the New Zealand environment
Timeline of New Zealand's links with Antarctica

References